The Billie Jean King Leadership Initiative (BJKLI) is a leadership and diversity nonprofit organization, founded by Billie Jean King in 2014. The BJKLI was created to promote diversity and inclusion in the workplace.

References

External links 
 http://www.bjkli.org

Sports organizations established in 2014
Women's sports organizations
Women's sports in the United States
Sports charities